Imperial China: 900–1800 is a history book written by Frederick W. Mote, Professor of Chinese History and Civilization, Emeritus, at Princeton University.  The book was published in 1999 by Harvard University Press.

Scope 
As the title suggests, Imperial China covers the 900-year period from the year 900 to 1800. In terms of Chinese history, it covers the period from the fall of the Tang dynasty to the middle of the Qing dynasty, shortly before the beginning of China's Century of Humiliation at the end of the Qing dynasty. It covers the Five Dynasties and Ten Kingdoms period, Liao dynasty, Song dynasty, Western Xia state, Jin dynasty, Yuan dynasty, Ming dynasty and the first 150 years of the Qing dynasty.

Contents
The nearly 1,000 pages of text are divided into five parts and are further divided into 36 chapters.

Part One
Conquest Dynasties and the Northern Song: 900–1127
1.  The Five Dynasties
2.  Abaoji
3.  Building the Liao Empire
4.  Liao Civilization
5.  Creating the Song Dynasty
6.  The World of Ideas in Northern Song China
7.  Dimensions of Northern Song Life
8.  Origins of the Xi Xia State

Part Two
Conquest Dynasties and the Southern Song:  1127–1279
9.  The "Wild Jurchens" Erupt into History
10.  The Jurchen State and Its Cultural Policy
11.  The Later Xi Xia State
12.  Trends of Change under Jin Alien Rule
13.  The Southern Song and Chinese Survival
14.  Chinese Civilization and the Song Achievement
15.  Southern Song Life – A Broader View
16.  A Mid-Thirteenth-Century Overview

Part Three
China and the Mongol World
17.  The Career of the Great Khan Chinggis
18.  Forging the Mongol World Empire
19.  Khubilai Khan Becomes Emperor of China
20.  China under Mongol Rule

Part Four
The Restoration of Native Rule Under the Ming
21.  From Chaos toward a New Chinese Order
22.  Zhu Yuanzhang Builds His Ming Dynasty
23.  Civil War and Usurpation
24.  The "Second Founding" of the Ming Dynasty
25.  Ming China in the Fifteenth century
26.  The Changing World of the Sixteenth century
27.  Ming China's Borders
28.  Late Ming Political Decline, 1567–1627
29.  The Lively Society of the Late Ming
30.  The Course of Ming Failure

Part Five
China and the World in Early Qing Times
31.  Alien Rule Returns
32.  The Kangxi Emperor: Coming of Age
33.  The Kangxi Reign: The Emperor and His Empire
34.  The Yongzheng Emperor as Man and Ruler
35.  Splendor and Degeneration, 1736–1799
36.  China's Legacy in a Changing World

References

1999 non-fiction books
History of Imperial China
History books about China